Studenčica (Cyrillic: Студенчица) is a village in the municipality of Konjic, Bosnia and Herzegovina.  Konjic is a municipality

Demographics 
According to the 2013 census, its population was 44, all Bosniaks.

References

Populated places in Konjic